is a town located in Iwate Prefecture, Japan. , the town had an estimated population of 8,895 in 3769 households, and a population density of 36 persons per km².

Geography
Karumai is located in far northcentral Iwate Prefecture, bordered by Aomori Prefecture to the north.

Neighboring municipalities
Aomori Prefecture
Hachinohe
Nanbu
Hashikami
Iwate Prefecture
Ninohe
Kuji
Hirono
Kunohe

Climate
Karumai has a humid oceanic climate (Köppen climate classification Cfa) characterized by mild summers and cold winters.  The average annual temperature in Karumai is 9.5 °C. The average annual rainfall is 1209 mm with September as the wettest month and February as the driest month. The temperatures are highest on average in August, at around 22.5 °C, and lowest in January, at around -2.4 °C.

Demographics
Per Japanese census data, the population of Karumai peaked at around the year 1960 and has steadily declined over the past 60 years.

History
The area of present-day Karumai was part of ancient Mutsu Province, dominated by the Nambu clan from the Muromachi period, and part of Hachinohe Domain under the Edo period Tokugawa shogunate. During the early Meiji period, the village of Karumai within Kitakunohe District, Iwate Prefecture was created on April 1, 1889, with the establishment of the modern municipalities system. Kita-Kunohe District and Minami-Kunohe Districts merged to form Kunohe District on April 1, 1897. The village was raised to town status on January 1, 1925. The neighboring villages of Kogarumai and Hareyama were merged with Karumai on January 1, 1955.

Government
Karumai has a mayor-council form of government with a directly elected mayor and a unicameral town council of 12 members. Karumai, as part of Kunohe District, contributes two seats to the Iwate Prefectural legislature. In terms of national politics, the town is part of Iwate 2nd district of the lower house of the Diet of Japan.

Economy
The economy of Karumai is based on agriculture, particularly the various grains, including millet, livestock raising, and the production of charcoal. The hardy kiwi is a noted local specialty.

Education
Karumai has three public elementary schools and one public middle school operated by the town government, and one public high school operated by the Iwate Prefectural Board of Education.

Transportation

Railway
Karumai does not have any passenger train service.

Highway
  – Orizume Service Area - Karumai Interchange

Noted people from Karumai
Haruichi Furudate, manga artist (Haikyu!!, Yotsuya Senpai no Kaidan). Much of Haikyu!! is based on actual locations in Karumai.

References

External links

Official Website 

 
Towns in Iwate Prefecture